The Danish Women's League is a professional top-flight league for women's football in Denmark. It is organised by the Danish Football Association (DBU) as part of the nation-wide Danmarksturneringen i kvindefodbold (Kvinde-DM) and is placed as the first division of the Danish football league system. Clubs in the league must meet certain criteria concerning appropriate facilities and finances. All of the league's clubs qualify for the proper rounds of the DBU KvindePokalen. The top teams of each season qualify for the UEFA Women's Champions League.

The division has changed its name on several occasions. It has previously been known simply as Danmarksturneringen i damefodbold (1975 until 1980), Dame 1. division (1981 until 1992), Elitedivisionen (1993 until 2015–16) before settling with the current name, Kvindeligaen, beginning with the 2016–17 season. Due to sponsorship arrangements, it was known as 3F Ligaen for fourteen seasons (2005–06 until 2018–19) and since the 2019–20 season as Gjensidige Kvindeligaen.

Format
From 1994 to 2005/06 the league consisted of 8 teams playing each other 3 times and the best team then was awarded the championship. The last team was relegated with the second last team playing a playoff, against the second team of the Kvinde 1. division.
2006/07 was a transition year, because the league was extended to 10 teams. The last team after the season played a relegation match against the third placed team of the 1. division, for a place in Elitedivisionen. The top two teams of the 1. division were automatically promoted.

From 2007/08 to 2012/13 the league consisted of 10 teams. Those 10 teams played a double round robin as a regular season. After that there are 2 Playoff Groups. Place 1 to 4 of the regular season play the Championship Playoff. Place 5 to 10 play the Relegation Playoff. In the Playoffs, the points accumulated over the regular season are divided by 2 (rounding up if necessary). Those points are the starting points for the playoffs. The Championship group plays another round robin (6 matches each) with the winner being awarded the championship title. The Relegation Group plays a single round robin (5 matches each) after which, the bottom two clubs are relegated.

The 2013/14 season again was played only with eight teams. The top six after the regular season play a championship group, the seventh plays a relegation play-off and the eight placed team gets relegated.

Clubs

National champions

2021–22 season

 Aalborg BK
 Aarhus GF
 Brøndby IF
 Fortuna Hjørring
 Kolding IF
 HB Køge
 FC Nordsjælland
 FC Thy-Thisted Q

Footnotes

References

External links
Official league site 

 
Women
Denmark
Summer association football leagues
League
Women's sports leagues in Denmark
Professional sports leagues in Denmark
Sports leagues established in 1974
1974 establishments in Denmark